Live In Austin, TX is the first live album by American rock duo The Black Keys. It was published as an electronic for podcast by Austin, Texas based Jumper Productions. This is derived from the 10,000 piece limited Thickfreakness In Austin music DVD-video released by the same company on September 7, 2004. Unlike the edited version available on the DVD, this audio version is full-length. The concert was recorded on October 24, 2003 at Austin's Emo's as part of the Thickfreakness U.S. tour. Near the end of "Them Eyes" a young woman from the audience suddenly climbed on stage and started to dance near the performers. Quickly after the song's ending, guitarist Dan Auerbach switched roles from guitarist to lighthearted bouncer; he asked her off the stage with a quip "Hey girl, you play bass? What's up?".

Track listing

Personnel
Dan Auerbach: guitar, vocals
Patrick Carney: drums

Production
Sal Ortiz-Steels: producer
Adam Agardy:  Director of Photography

External links 
Jumper Productions website
Full-length Live In Austin video

The Black Keys albums
2006 live albums